United Nations Security Council Resolution 217, adopted unanimously on November 20, 1965, determined that the situation resulting from the Unilateral Declaration of Independence was extremely grave and that the Government of the United Kingdom should put an end to it as it constitutes a threat to international peace and security.  The Council also called upon nations not to recognize what it deemed "this illegal authority" or entertain diplomatic relations with it.  It also asked all states to refrain from economic relations with Rhodesia.

The resolution was adopted by ten votes to one; France abstained.

The interception of Joanna V was an action of the British Navy Beira Patrol carried out in accordance to this resolution on 4 April. However this action proved ineffective and  United Nations Security Council Resolution 221 was then adopted on 9 April to grant more powers to the Beira Patrol.

See also
List of United Nations Security Council Resolutions 201 to 300 (1965–1971)

References

External links
 
Text of the Resolution at undocs.org

 0217
 0217
1965 in Rhodesia
November 1965 events